Dynin may refer to:
Dynín, a village
Alexander Dynin, mathematician